Bhai Bahen is a 1950 Bollywood musical film directed by Ram Daryani. The film was made under the banner of Krishna movies and had music direction by Shyam Sunder. The film starred Geeta Bali, Nirupa Roy, Prem Adib, Bharat Bhushan, Gope, Jeevan and Cuckoo.

Cast
Geeta Bali   
Bharat Bhushan   
Nirupa Roy
Prem Adib
Gope
Jeevan
Cuckoo
K. N. Singh
Yashodhra Katju

References

External links
 

1950 films
1950s Hindi-language films
1950 musical films
Indian musical films
Indian black-and-white films